Federal Prison Camp, Eglin was a Federal Bureau of Prisons minimum security prison at Auxiliary Field 6, Eglin Air Force Base in Florida.

Lacey Rose of Forbes wrote that it "was once considered so cushy that the term "Club Fed" was actually coined to describe it."

By 2006 the federal government decided to cut costs by closing Eglin and returning the buildings to the Air Force. The prisoners were moved to Federal Prison Camp, Pensacola.

Notable inmates

The five Watergate burglars - Bernard Barker, Virgilio Gonzalez, Eugenio Martínez, James W. McCord Jr., and Frank Sturgis - were inmates at Eglin.

See also

References

External links
  - Federal Bureau of Prisons

2006 disestablishments in Florida
Buildings and structures in Okaloosa County, Florida
Defunct prisons in Florida
Federal Prison Camps